The Nahoon Nature Reserve, part of the greater East London Coast Nature Reserve, is a nature reserve in the Wild Coast region of the Eastern Cape. The reserve is located on the northern bank of the Nahoon River estuary.

History 
This 33 ha reserve was established in 1988 along with the Quenera Nature Reserve for the conservation of the region's fauna and flora.

See also 

 List of protected areas of South Africa

References 

Nature reserves in South Africa
Eastern Cape Provincial Parks